Ahmed Mohammad Barzani (1896 – 11 January 1969), also known as Khudan, was the head of the Barzani tribe in Kurdistan. Sheikh Ahmed is considered to be the architect of Barzani rule in Iraqi Kurdistan. He was a Kurdish nationalist who brought many different Kurdish tribes under his command and expanded the Barzan region. Along with his younger brother Mustafa Barzani, he fought against the Iraqi government in the 1920s and 1930s.

Battle with Assyrians 
When Assyrians were returning to Hakkari, Ahmed Barzani and his Zibari allies tried to prevent the Assyrians from passing through their territory. The Assyrians defeated them and inflicted heavy losses.

Barzani revolts

The first of the major Barzani revolts took place in 1931 after Mustafa Barzani, one of the most prominent Kurdish leaders in Iraqi Kurdistan and the brother of Ahmed, succeeded in defeating a number of other Kurdish tribes who questioned their dominance.

He was later forced to flee to Turkey, where he was held in detention and then sent to exile in the south of Iraq. He headed Barzan's largest revolution from 1931 to 1937 and gained the respect of many Iraqi Army generals who were fighting him, such as General Abdul-Jabar Barznji the commander of Iraqi Army in Barzan region.

Barzani was the center of focus of the British, Iraqi and Turkish discontent. He was very sympathetic to the Kurdish movements in the North led by Khoyboun (the Ararat Revolt). He received many Kurds who were seeking sanctuary in Barzan, including Kor Hussein Pasha. In September 1930, a Turkish military attaché in Baghdad told Iraq's Prime Minister Nuri Said, "the Turkish military operations in Ararat were very successful. The army will carry similar operations to the west of the Lake of Wan. We expect these operations to come to an end soon. The Turkish army will mobilize along the Iraq-Turkey border if the Iraqi Army moves against the Sheikh Barzan. In fact, Ismet Inonu complained to Nuri Said in Ankara that Sheikh Ahmed was supporting the insurrection in Ararat (see Archive E4976/1932/93, dated 4SEP1930)

Environmental protection
Barzani was the first known Kurdish environmentalist and conservationist leader. He enforced regulations to maintain a clean and sustainable environment. He prohibited, among other things:
Cutting down trees, especially those which provide shade and prevent erosion
Overharvesting honey
Killing non-poisonous snakes.
Fishing with dynamite and other explosives
Hunting during breeding season.

Barzani's legacy

Barzani rejected the traditional way of maintaining leadership within the same family. He emphasized that whoever takes the lead must be qualified for such a job. He condemned the corruption which was beginning to take part within the Kurdish Movement and was highly critical of ignoring the oppressed masses who were the victims of the movement's failures. He is also credited with emphasizing that marriage should be voluntary: such freedom he considered a basic civil right and stressed it publicly.

References

1896 births
1969 deaths
Converts to Christianity from Islam
Iraqi former Muslims
Iraqi Kurdish people
Kurdish Christians
Kurdish nationalists
People from Barzan
Democratic Party of Iranian Kurdistan politicians